The Turkey women's national basketball team is the women's basketball side that represents Turkey in international tournaments. They have come away from the EuroBasket tournaments with a bronze medal in 2011 and silver medal in 2013.

Competitive record

Olympic Games

FIBA Women's World Cup

EuroBasket Women

Mediterranean Games

Team

Current roster 
Roster for the EuroBasket Women 2023 Qualifiers.
{| class="toccolours" style="font-size: 88%; width: 69%; "
! colspan="2" style="background-color: #E30A17; color: white; text-align: center;" | Turkey women's national basketball team
|- style="background-color: white ;color: #E30A17; text-align: center;"
! Players !! Coaches
|-
| valign="top" | 
{| class="sortable" style="background:transparent; margin:0px; width:100%;"
!  !!  !! Name  !! Age – Date of birth !! Height !! Club 
|-

|- 
!colspan=121 | Call-ups

Past rosters 

2005 EuroBasket: finished 8th among 12 teams

Şaziye İvegin-Karslı, Birsel Vardarlı, Müjde Yüksel, Nilay Yiğit, Şebnem Kimyacıoğlu, Esmeral Tunçluer, Aylin Yıldızoğlu, Nevriye Yılmaz, Serap Yücesir, Yasemin Horasan, Arzu Bildirir, Korel Engin, (Coach: Cem Akdağ)

2007 EuroBasket: finished 9th among 16 teams

Şaziye İvegin-Karslı, Gülşah Akkaya, Birsel Vardarlı, Nilay Yiğit, Şebnem Kimyacıoğlu, Esmeral Tunçluer, Işıl Alben, Nevriye Yılmaz, Didem Sarıca, Yasemin Horasan, Bahar Çağlar, Korel Engin, (Coach: Cem Akdağ)

2009 EuroBasket: finished 9th among 16 teams

Şaziye İvegin-Karslı, Yasemen Saylar, Birsel Vardarlı, Nilay Yiğit, Tuğba Palazoğlu, Gülşah Gümüşay, Sariye Gökçe, Melek Bilge, Naile İvegin, Yasemin Horasan, Nevin Nevlin, Bahar Çağlar, (Coach: Ceyhun Yıldızoğlu)

2011 EuroBasket: finished 2nd among 16 teams

Nilay Yiğit, Birsel Vardarlı, Işıl Alben, Tuğba Palazoğlu, Seda Erdoğan, Gülşah Akkaya, Şaziye İvegin-Karslı, Bahar Çağlar, Yasemin Horasan, Naile Ivegin, Nevriye Yılmaz, Nevin Nevlin, (Coach: Ceyhun Yıldızoğlu)

2013 EuroBasket: finished 3rd among 16 teams

Tuğba Palazoğlu, Tuğçe Canıtez, Ayşegül Günay, Birsel Vardarlı, Yasemin Begüm Dalgalar, Esmeral Tunçluer, Işıl Alben, Nevriye Yılmaz, Naile Çırak, Quanitra Hollingsworth, Şaziye İvegin, Bahar Çağlar, (Coach: Ceyhun Yıldızoğlu)

2014 FIBA World Championship for Women: finished 4th among 16 teams

Tuğba Palazoğlu, Tuğçe Canıtez, Cansu Köksal, Birsel Vardarlı, Yasemin Begüm Dalgalar, Esmeral Tunçluer, Işıl Alben, Nevriye Yılmaz, LaToya Pringle, Tilbe Şenyürek, Şaziye İvegin, Bahar Çağlar, (Coach: Ceyhun Yıldızoğlu)

2015 EuroBasket : finished 5th among 20 teams

Pınar Demirok, Tuğçe Canıtez, Cansu Köksal, Birsel Vardarlı, Olcay Çakır, Bahar Çağlar, Işıl Alben, Nevriye Yılmaz, Lara Sanders, Ayşe Cora, Tilbe Şenyürek, Şaziye İvegin, (Coach: Sevgi Karasu)

2017 EuroBasket : finished 5th among 16 teams

Pelin Bilgiç, Ayşe Cora, Olcay Çakır, Birsel Vardarlı, Bahar Çağlar, Işıl Alben, Tuğçe Canıtez, Quanitra Hollingsworth, Şaziye İvegin, Tilbe Şenyürek, Cansu Köksal, Esra Ural, (Coach: Ekrem Memnun)

2019 EuroBasket : finished 14th among 16 teams

See also 
Turkey women's national under-20 basketball team
Turkey women's national under-18 and under-19 basketball team
Turkey women's national under-16 and under-17 basketball team
Turkey women's national 3x3 team

References

External links 

FIBA Profile

 
 
Women's national basketball teams